Bartłomiejowice refers to the following places in Poland:

 Bartłomiejowice, Kuyavian-Pomeranian Voivodeship
 Bartłomiejowice, Lublin Voivodeship